Clinical and Experimental Dermatology is a peer-reviewed medical journal provide relevant and educational material for practising clinicians and dermatological researchers. The journal is published by Wiley.

Abstracting and indexing 
The journal is abstracted and indexed in:

 Abstracts in Anthropology (Sage)
 Abstracts on Hygiene & Communicable Diseases (CABI)
 Academic Search (EBSCO Publishing)
 Academic Search Alumni Edition (EBSCO Publishing)
 Academic Search Elite (EBSCO Publishing)
 Academic Search Premier (EBSCO Publishing)
 AgBiotech News & Information (CABI)
 AgBiotechNet (CABI)

According to the Journal Citation Reports, the journal has a 2020 impact factor of 3.470.

References

External links 

 

English-language journals
Publications with year of establishment missing
Dermatology journals
ISSN needed